Carol Zhao (Chinese:赵一羽; born June 20, 1995) is a Canadian tennis player. She turned professional in June 2016 and was Canada's top singles player from June 11th, 2018 to July 23rd, 2018.  She reached her highest WTA singles ranking of No. 131 on June 25, 2018, and her career-high junior rank of No. 9 on January 1, 2013. She won the Australian Open junior doubles title in 2013. Zhao was a member of the Stanford University tennis team,  ending her college career with a 76–16 overall record and leading the team to win the 2016 NCAA championship. She also was the 2015 NCAA singles runner-up.

Early life
Zhao was born in Chongqing, China to Ping and Lily Zhao and started playing tennis at the age of five, with the encouragement of her grade school teacher. At the age of seven, she and her family emigrated to Canada and settled in the city of Richmond Hill, Ontario. In September 2010, she relocated to Montreal to be part of the National Training Centre until August 2013.

Tennis career

2010–11
In July 2010, Zhao won three straight junior singles tournaments at the G5 in Edmonton, G4 in Vancouver and G5 in Manitoba, respectively. She also won three junior doubles tournaments around that time. She reached the semifinals in doubles of the GB1 in Tulsa in October. In November, Zhao played her first professional quarterfinal at the $50k tournament in Toronto.

In January 2011, Zhao reached the semifinals in doubles to back to back tournaments, the GA in Tlalnepantla and the G1 in San José. In March, she lost to Ashleigh Barty in the final of the G1 in Kuching. Zhao reached in June the second round of the French Open, her first junior Grand Slam tournament. She lost in the first round of the junior US Open in September.

2012
In January 2012, Zhao lost in the second round in singles and the quarterfinals in doubles at the junior Australian Open. In March, she made the final in both singles and doubles of the G1 in Nonthaburi, but only won the doubles title. She lost a week later to Elizaveta Kulichkova in the final of the G1 in Sarawak. Zhao reached the second round for the second straight year at the junior French Open. In late June, Zhao reached her third G1 final of the year, but lost this time to fellow Canadian Eugenie Bouchard in three sets. Three of the four semifinalists were Canadian at this tournament (the third was Françoise Abanda). However, she lost in the first round of the junior Wimbledon Championships.

In September, Zhao lost in an all-Canadian final at the G1 in Repentigny to Françoise Abanda. A week later, she made it to the third round in singles at the junior US Open. She also reached the quarterfinals in doubles. In mid-September, Zhao reached the quarterfinals in doubles of the WTA tournament in Quebec City. In October, she ended runner-up in the GB1 in Tulsa, but won the final in doubles.

2013
Zhao lost in the second round of the junior Australian Open in singles, but won the doubles title with Ana Konjuh by defeating Oleksandra Korashvili and Barbora Krejčíková in the final. In May, she made it to her first professional doubles final at the $10k event in Pula, but lost to Italians Martina Caregaro and Anna Floris. She also reached her first singles final at the same tournament, but was defeated this time by Sofiya Kovalets. At the junior event of the French Open, Zhao reached the third round in singles and made it to the semifinals in doubles. She also reached the third round at the junior Wimbledon in singles and the quarterfinals in doubles.

Zhao won in July the doubles title at the $25k event in Granby, her first pro title. At the beginning of August, she qualified for her first WTA Tour main draw at the Premier 5 Rogers Cup in Toronto when she defeated her first top 100 player Irina-Camelia Begu in straight sets in last round of qualifying. She was eliminated by No. 31, Anastasia Pavlyuchenkova, in the first round. She made it to the quarterfinals in doubles for the second straight year at the Challenge Bell in mid-September.

2014
In July at the $25k Challenger de Gatineau, her first tournament in nine months, Zhao made it to the semifinals in doubles. She made it a week later, with Erin Routliffe, to her third professional doubles final and second consecutive at the $25k Challenger de Granby but had to withdraw before the final because of an injury. At the Bank of the West Classic at the end of July, Zhao qualified for her second WTA Tour main draw and scored her first win on the tour when Yanina Wickmayer retired in the second set of the opening round. She was eliminated by No. 11, Ana Ivanovic, in the second round. In late August, Zhao reached the quarterfinals in singles and the semifinals in doubles of the $25k event in Winnipeg.

2015
In late June, Zhao made it to the semifinals in singles and in doubles of the $25k tournament in Sumter. The next week, she reached the quarterfinals at the $25K in Baton Rouge. At the Pan American Games in July, Zhao won a gold medal with Gabriela Dabrowski in the doubles event. In August, at the $25k Challenger de Gatineau, she reached the semifinals in singles and won the doubles title with Jessica Moore. A week later, she was awarded a wildcard for the main draw of the Bank of the West Classic but was defeated by No. 63, Mona Barthel, in the opening round. At the Rogers Cup in August, Zhao earned a wildcard for the singles main draw but was defeated by No. 43, Madison Brengle, in the first round. She also reached the quarterfinals in doubles with fellow Canadian Sharon Fichman. In October, she reached the quarterfinals in singles at the Challenger de Saguenay and the semifinals in both singles and doubles at the Tevlin Women's Challenger.

2016
In January, Zhao reached the final of the $25k event in Daytona Beach with Sharon Fichman. In February, she and partner Jessica Pegula were runners-up at the $25k in Rancho Santa Fe. At the $25k in Sumter in June, her first tournament as a professional, Zhao reached the final in doubles. She also reached the doubles final of the $25k in El Paso at the beginning of July. At the Stanford Classic, Zhao was awarded a wildcard for the singles main draw for the second straight year, but was defeated by No. 71, Nicole Gibbs, in three sets in the opening round. She also lost in the first round in doubles.

2017
In January at the $15k event in Petit-Bourg, Zhao won her third doubles title, this time with Mayo Hibi. She advanced to the doubles final of the $15k in Heraklion with compatriot Charlotte Robillard-Millette in March. Two weeks later, she won the third $15k in Heraklion, which was the fourth doubles title of her career title and her first with Robillard-Millette. In July, she won the doubles title with Ellen Perez at the $60k Challenger de Granby. In August at the $100k Vancouver Open, Zhao advanced to the semifinals where she was defeated by Danka Kovinić. The next week at the $25k tournament in Tsukuba, she reached the second singles final of her career but lost to Zhang Ling. The week after, Zhao captured her first singles title with a win over Junri Namigata at the $25k in Nanao. In October at the $60k event in Saguenay, she reached the quarterfinals in singles and won the doubles title with fellow Canadian Bianca Andreescu. In November, she won her second singles title defeating Liu Fangzhou in the final of the $100k Shenzhen Open.

Performance timeline
Only main-draw results in WTA Tour, Grand Slam tournaments, Fed Cup/Billie Jean King Cup and Olympic Games are included in win–loss records.

Singles 
Current after the 2023 Australian Open.

ITF Circuit finals

Singles: 8 (4 titles, 4 runner-ups)

Doubles: 13 (6 titles, 7 runner-ups)

Junior Grand Slam finals

Doubles: 1 (title)

Record against top-100 players
Zhao's win–loss record (6–11, 35%) against players who were ranked world No. 100 or higher when played is as follows: Players who have been ranked world No. 1 are in boldface.

 Yanina Wickmayer 1–0
 Irina-Camelia Begu 1–0
 Kristýna Plíšková 1–0
 Kateryna Kozlova 1–0
 Verónica Cepede Royg 1–0
 Ons Jabeur 1–0
 Ana Ivanovic 0–1
 Anastasia Pavlyuchenkova 0–1
 Sorana Cîrstea 0–1
 Mona Barthel 0–1
 Christina McHale 0–1
 Monica Niculescu 0–1
 Madison Brengle 0–1
 Alison Van Uytvanck 0–1
 Tatjana Maria 0–1
 Nicole Gibbs 0–1
 Ekaterina Alexandrova 0–1

* statistics as of June 5, 2018

Notes

References

External links

 
 
 
 Stanford Cardinal profile

1995 births
Living people
Canadian female tennis players
Canadian sportspeople of Chinese descent
Sportspeople from Richmond Hill, Ontario
Racket sportspeople from Ontario
Sportspeople from Chongqing
Australian Open (tennis) junior champions
Grand Slam (tennis) champions in girls' doubles
Tennis players at the 2015 Pan American Games
Stanford Cardinal women's tennis players
Pan American Games gold medalists for Canada
Pan American Games medalists in tennis
Medalists at the 2015 Pan American Games